Mark Angelo Cadaweng Cielo (May 12, 1988 – December 7, 2008), better known as Marky Cielo, was a Filipino actor, dancer, and the first known Igorot in Philippine showbiz. He was notable for his win in the reality talent competition StarStruck (March 12, 2006). During his two-year career, he was able to star in several television shows and in one film, notably Fantastikids (2006), Asian Treasures (2007), Boys Nxt Door (2007), Zaido: Pulis Pangkalawakan (2007–2008), Sine Novela: Kaputol ng Isang Awit (2008), and his final performance, LaLola (2008). He also dubbed into Filipino language to be voiced of the character Ichigo Kurosaki in the anime Bleach (2007).

Early life
Mark Angelo Cadaweng Cielo, better known as Boknoi to his family and friends, was born on May 12, 1988 at Manuel J. Santos Hospital in Butuan in Agusan del Norte, where he lived with his mother, Mildred Ban-eg Cadaweng and sister, Marcel Andrea or "Bonsai". In 2001, he and his family moved to Bauko, Mountain Province to live with their other relatives, who are of Igorot descent. As a student of the local high school, San Isidro, he would soon become proud of his indigenous roots, despite being raised in the Roman Catholic environment. He fluently spoke Kankana-ey, a language spoken in the Cordilleras. Aside from this, he was also fluent in English, Ilocano, Tagalog, and Visayan languages (specifically Butuanon and Cebuano). According to an episode of  Magpakailanman which revolved around life, his parents separated when he was still young and his mother took care of him, along with his sister on her own. Despite this, he was able to reunite with his father, Avelino "Bobby" Cielo, and spend time with him after many years. Later in his life, he had stated, privately, that he truly loves his father.

Career
Prior to his career, Cielo was a freshman studying Architecture at Saint Louis University, Baguio in Benguet, where he was a member of SLU Dance Troupe. When his classmates and close friends convinced him to audition for Starstruck, he accepted so he joined under the stage name, Marky Cielo. He audition for Starstruck where he emerged as "Ultimate Male Survivor" and the first and only "Sole Survivor", defeating his fellow contestants Jackie Rice, Gian Carlos, Iwa Moto, Chuck Allie, and Arci Muñoz. He is the first Igorot ever to join a talent contest. He won 10 million pesos worth of prizes and an exclusive GMA talent management contract, and a house and lot in Antipolo, Rizal. He and his family moved to this new home only in 2008, during his birthday, May 12. Prior to that, he lived in Pasig.

Soon after winning StarStruck, Cielo made his debut as the lead role Daniel Trinidad in the fantasy television show, Fantastikids. After this, he began to appear in primetime with guest starring roles in shows first in  Encantadia: Pag-ibig Hanggang Wakas as Arman, then Bakekang as Miguelito "Michael" Dimayacyac and Asian Treasures as Mateo Madrigal;, as well as a leading role in the Sunday afternoon drama, Boys Nxt Door, which is dubbed in Malay by 8TV and is to be the first Philippine drama to air on KBS2 of South Korea. In 2007, he and fellow StarStruck graduates, Yasmien Kurdi and Rainier Castillo decided to shift from mainstream acting to voice acting for a while by trying characters from the anime Bleach, such as Ichigo Kurosaki. During the same year, he won the Guillermo Mendoza Memorial Scholarship Foundation Award for Most Promising Male Artist. He was soon chosen by his network to be the main protagonist in the Philippine remake of Uchuu Keiji Shaider as Alexis del Mundo or Shaider but Dennis Trillo and Aljur Abrenica were included so the show was reformatted to Zaido: Pulis Pangkalawakan, a spin-off sequel to the Metal Hero Series. He joined the cast of Sine Novela: Kaputol ng Isang Awit, which also stars Glaiza de Castro, Lovi Poe and Jolo Revilla. He was also a spokesman for Department of Health and was seen in a no-smoking ad campaign with secretary Francisco Duque III. In 2008, he joined the cast of Codename: Asero then LaLola. His last appearance was in LaLola, in which he portrayed the character Billy Lobregat.

Death
Cielo, 20, was found unconscious on December 7, 2008, by his mother. The night before, he was last seen playing an online video game up until 10 PM in an internet cafe in Quezon City. Marky is said to have made several unanswered calls to his manager-mentor. When he arrived home, he had a discussion with his mother about "something personal". His mother advised Marky to sort out his problem saying that only he can solve his problems. The next morning, his mother entered his room in their house in Antipolo at around 6 AM to wake him up for a charity event. When he did not respond, she immediately rushed him to the nearby Antipolo Doctors Hospital where he was declared dead on arrival. At present, the Cause of Cielo's Death remains unknown. 

His wake was held in his home for three days then his remains were brought to the Cathedral of the Resurrection in Baguio, where it stayed for a day. He was buried on December 15, in Bauko, Mountain Province, in his family's backyard according to traditional Kankanaey custom.

Filmography

Television

Film

Honors and awards
Posthimously Celebrity Inductee Winner, Eastwood City Walk Of Fame Philippines 2009
21st and 22nd PMPC Star Awards for Television (won, 2007 & 2008)
Guillermo Mendoza's Most Promising Male Star of 2007
Candy Mag's 100 Candy Cuties (#17)
Cosmopolitan Top 69 Bachelors
Yes! Magazine's The next Big Thing
Yes! Magazine's 100 Most Beautiful Stars Of 2007
StarStruck's First and Only Ultimate Sole Survivor (2006)

References

External links
Marky Cielo at iGMA.tv

Marky Cielo at Friendster
Fansite

1988 births
2008 deaths
Filipino male child actors
Filipino male voice actors
Filipino Roman Catholics
Saint Louis University (Philippines) alumni
Filipino male television actors
Igorot people
People from Butuan
Visayan people
StarStruck (Philippine TV series) participants
People from Mountain Province
Participants in Philippine reality television series
Reality show winners
StarStruck (Philippine TV series) winners
GMA Network personalities
Filipino male film actors
Filipino male dancers
21st-century dancers
21st-century Filipino male actors